Site of the Daye Soldiers Revolt is located within the campus of Daye Foreign Language School.  In 1954 it was listed as a Historical and Cultural site Protected at the County Level, and in 2006 it was named a Major Historical and Cultural Site Protected at the National Level. On December 14, 1929, Cheng Zihua, then a platoon leader of National Revolutionary Army, led a revolt in collaboration with 5th Corps of the Red Army. The site was first built as Wubei Institute in 1827. It has a construction area of 2500 square meters.

References

Major National Historical and Cultural Sites in Hubei